A Cornelian dilemma (dilemme cornélien) (also spelt in translation with two "l"'s i.e. "Corneillian") is a dilemma in which someone is obliged to choose one option from a range of options all of which reveals a detrimental effect on themselves or someone near them. In classical drama, it will typically involve the character experiencing an inner conflict, forcing them to choose between love and honour or inclination and duty. The dilemma is named after French dramatist Pierre Corneille, in whose play Le Cid (1636) the protagonist, Rodrigue, is torn between two desires: that of the love of Chimène, or avenging his family, who has been wronged by Chimène's father. Rodrigue either seeks revenge to avenge his lover or lose the honour.

Examples 
In "Latent Image", the doctor experiences crippling guilt after having ethical dilemma of making an arbitrary choice between leaving two survivors. The situation is not used for the triage program.
In "The Perfect Mate", Kamala the Metamorph learns the meaning of duty from Picard and fulfills it.
In Grand Theft Auto IV, Niko Bellic chooses to kill either Roman or Kate McReary.

See also
No-win situation
Hobson's choice
Lesser of two evils principle

References
"Hobbes or Corneille?"

Concepts in ethics
Theatre
Dilemmas
Pierre Corneille